Kazi Khalek (1915–1970) was a Bangladeshi film actor. He is known for his outstanding contribution to development of the film industry in Dhaka. In 1958, he entered the film industry starring in the film Asiya, directed by Fateh Lohani. The first movie released by him in Dhaka was Jago Hua Severa, directed by AJ Karadar. In his acting career, he played in 28 films. His notable films include Tomar Amar, Surja Snan, Sonar Kajol, Dharapat, Nadi o Nari, Bhawal Sanyasi, Chaoya Paoya, Nayantara, Natun Diganta, Etotuku Asha, Ballobandhu, Aban Chhita and Je Agune Puri.

Early life
Kazi Khalek was born on 1915 in Bikrampur district of Dhaka (now in Munshiganj district).

Filmography

Death
Kazi Khaleq died on 12 September 1970.

References

Footnotes

Bibliography

External links

1970 deaths
1915 births
Bangladeshi male film actors
Bengali male actors
Bangladeshi male actors
20th-century Bangladeshi actors
People from Munshiganj District